Fundiseius is a genus of mites in the Phytoseiidae family.

Species
 Fundiseius arenicolus (Muma, 1965)
 Fundiseius cavei Denmark & Evans, in Denmark, Evans, Aguilar, Vargas & Ochoa 1999
 Fundiseius cesi (Muma, 1965)
 Fundiseius coronatus (Fox, 1946)
 Fundiseius costaricus Denmark & Evans, in Denmark, Evans, Aguilar, Vargas & Ochoa 1999
 Fundiseius gonzalezi (Athias-Henriot, 1967)
 Fundiseius grandis (Berlese, 1914)
 Fundiseius hapoli (Gupta, 1986)
 Fundiseius imbricata (Muma & Denmark, 1969)
 Fundiseius morgani (Chant, 1957)
 Fundiseius sentralus Denmark & Evans, in Denmark, Evans, Aguilar, Vargas & Ochoa 1999
 Fundiseius timagami (Chant & Hansell, 1971)
 Fundiseius tucumanensis (Sheals, 1962)
 Fundiseius urquharti (Yoshida-Shaul & Chant, 1988)

References

Phytoseiidae